Primera Nacional (usually called simply Nacional B, in English "National B Division", and known as Primera B Nacional until the 2019–20 season) is the second division of the Argentine football league system. The competition is made up of 37 teams.

It is played by teams from all over the country. Clubs from Buenos Aires surroundings, as well as some from Santa Fe Province, are promoted from or relegated to the Primera B Metropolitana ("Metropolitan B Division") while for teams from the other provinces the Torneo Federal A ("Federal A Tournament") is the next level down. In Argentine football, Nacional B is the second-highest league, and from it, the three best teams are automatically promoted to Primera División.

Primera B Nacional games are often transmitted to Argentina and abroad on television by TyC Sports.

History
It was created in 1986 to integrate unaffiliated clubs into the Argentine football structure, which until then had only participated in Nacional championships of Argentina's First Division tournament. It brought together teams from the old Primera B (until then, the second division) and regional leagues from several Argentine provinces.

After the 1985–86 season, the Primera B Nacional became the second hierarchical league in Argentina's professional football, after the Primera División, and it is above the Torneo Federal A and the Primera B Metropolitana, the last one started to act as a third division for the teams directly affiliated to AFA.

Beginning in the 2019–20 season, the name was changed dropping the B to simply be known as Primera Nacional.

Format

Thirty-seven teams play each other once for a total of thirty-six rounds. The top-placed team will be the champion and will also earn promotion to the Primera División. The teams placed from 2nd to 13th place will compete in the "Torneo Reducido" for the second promotion berth after the regular season ends, with the team placed 2nd entering in the third round, the team placed 3rd entering in the second round and the teams placed 4th to 13th entering in the first round.

List of champions
Since the first season held in 1986–87, the following teams have crowned champions of the division:

Notes

Titles by club

Seasons in Primera Nacional

Top scorers

Notes

References

External links
 
 Ascenso del Interior 
 Interior Futbolero   
 Promiedos 
 Primera B Nacional summary on Soccerway

 
1986 establishments in Argentina
2
Professional sports leagues in Argentina
Argentina
Sports leagues established in 1986